Mitko Stoilov (born 4 February 1983) is a Macedonian handball player Who plays for RK Mladost Bogdanci.

References
http://www.telegraf.mk/sport/294474-oficijalno-mite-stoilov-vo-rabotnicki
http://sportmedia.mk/rakomet/domashna-liga/rabotnichki-kje-se-razdeli-so-stoilov-i-levov
http://www.sport.com.mk/default.asp?ItemID=C544BA4332CD8640B1FC92F60439C31A
http://24rakomet.mk/?p=28292
http://www.gol.mk/rakomet/mladost-od-bogdanci-esenski-shampion-vo-prvata-rakometna-liga

1983 births
Living people
Macedonian male handball players